West Memphis Municipal Airport  is a city-owned public-use airport located three miles (5 km) west of the central business district of West Memphis, in Crittenden County, Arkansas, United States.

According to the FAA's National Plan of Integrated Airport Systems for 2007–2011, West Memphis Municipal Airport is categorized as a reliever airport.

Facilities and aircraft 
For the 12-month period ending August 31, 2006, the airport had 75,000 aircraft operations, an average of 205 per day:
99.7% general aviation and 0.3% military. There are 124 aircraft based at this airport: 82% single-engine, 17% multi-engine and 1% helicopter.

References

External links 

Airports in Arkansas
Transportation in Crittenden County, Arkansas
Buildings and structures in West Memphis, Arkansas